Judge Shaw may refer to:

Robert Shaw (judge) (1907–1972), judge of the United States District Court for the District of New Jersey
Charles Alexander Shaw (1944–2020), judge of the United States District Court for the Eastern District of Missouri
Elwyn Riley Shaw (1888–1950), judge of the United States District Court for the Northern District of Illinois
John Malach Shaw (1931–1999), judge of the United States District Court for the Western District of Louisiana

See also
Justice Shaw (disambiguation)